Yurac Salla (possibly from Quechua yuraq white, salla large cliff of gravel, "white cliff of gravel") is a mountain in the Vilcanota mountain range in the Andes of Peru, about  high. It is lies in the Puno Region, Carabaya Province, Ollachea District. Yurac Salla is situated north-east of the mountains Jori Pintay, Taruca Sayana and Quello Sallayoc.

There is a little lake south-east of Yurac Salla named Joritoruyoc ("the one with gold mud"). An intermittent stream of the same name flows from the lake to the north-east where it meets the river Quichomayu.

References

Mountains of Peru
Mountains of Puno Region